Chase Foster Ealey (born July 20, 1994) is an American track and field athlete specializing in throwing events. She won the gold medal at the 2022 World Athletics Championships in women’s shot put, which made her the first American woman to win a shot put world title at the World Athletics Championships. She won on the first attempt, which according to Bill Mallon made her the first woman’s shot put world champion to win on the first attempt.

Professional
Ealey is the 2022 outdoor world shot put champion and the 2019 US outdoor and indoor shot put champion. She is the 2018 United States Indoor 4th-place finisher in the shot put.
Ealey shared how she dealt with mental challenges of competing on the global stage at 2019 World Championship and how she is recovering from COVID-19 in Winter 2021. Ealey conducted clinics for high school and youth athletes in 2019.

NCAA
Ealey is an Oklahoma State University alum. Ealey is a 3 time All-America and 12 time Big 12 conference student-athlete.

Prep
Ealey is a Los Alamos High School alum in Los Alamos, New Mexico. 
Ealey placed 1st in the 2010 New Mexico 4A State Championship girls in the 100m dash with a time of 12.46 seconds, and placed 2nd in the 2010 New Mexico 4A State Championship girls shot put as a sophomore with a throw of  narrowly beating her 12 grade, 2 years older sister Taylor Ealey. 

References

External links
 
 
 
 2015-16 Oklahoma State University Women's Track and Field Roster CHASE EALEY Profile
 Chase Ealey Milesplit Profile 

1994 births
Living people
World Athletics Championships athletes for the United States
World Athletics Indoor Championships medalists
Sportspeople from Springfield, Illinois
People from Los Alamos, New Mexico
Track and field athletes from Illinois
Track and field athletes from New Mexico
American female shot putters
Oklahoma State Cowgirls track and field athletes
USA Indoor Track and Field Championships winners
USA Outdoor Track and Field Championships winners
20th-century American women
21st-century American women